TEXEL Energy Storage formerly United Sun Systems International Ltd is a Swedish Greentech company known for manufacturing Hybrid Battery technology.

History

The company was founded by Lars Jacobsson in 2010 as United Sun Systems which was renamed in 2018 as TEXEL Energy Storage.

After the bankruptcy of the American company Stirling Energy Systems in 2012, United Sun Systems bought the Stirling Energy Systems Maricopa solar plant in Phoenix, Arizona, in a joint venture with a Chinese/American corporation.

TEXEL signed a license agreement in 2018 on a new battery/energy storage solution with US Department of Energy (DOE) and Savannah River National laboratory (SRNL).

In September 2018 at the DOE, X-Labs, Stanford University energy storage summit at SLAC in Silicon Valley the TEXEL technology was appointed the success story beyond lithium batteries.

Gallery

References

External links 
 
 Article in daily Expressen
 Article in daily Hallandsposten

Engineering companies of the United Kingdom
Solar energy companies of the United Kingdom